Ruslan Menirovich Pateev (born April 25, 1990) is a Russian professional basketball player for Legia Warszawa. He was born in Moscow, Soviet Union, and played college basketball at Arizona State University.

Early career
Pateev started his youth club basketball career in 2005, in Khimki's youth teams, where he played in the European Youth Basketball League. In 2007, he moved to Montverde Academy, in Florida, United States, where he spent two years, playing under head coach Kevin Sutton.

College career
In 2009, Pateev moved to Arizona State University, where he played college basketball, with the Arizona State Sun Devils, until 2013.

Professional career
In September 2013, Pateev signed a two-year pro-contract with the Russian VTB United League team Khimki Moscow Region.

In August 2018 Pateev signed a deal with Polish basketball team Legia Warsaw from top Polish division. He averaged 6.9 points and 3.4 rebounds per game. In 2019, he signed with MBA Moscow of the Russian Basketball Super League 1. Pateev re-signed with the team on August 25, 2020.

He now plays for Legia Warszawa.

References

External links
Euroleague.net Profile
Eurobasket.com Profile
Arizona State College Bio

1990 births
Living people
Arizona State Sun Devils men's basketball players
BC Khimki players
Centers (basketball)
Legia Warsaw (basketball) players
Russian expatriate basketball people in the United States
Russian men's basketball players
Basketball players from Moscow
Montverde Academy alumni